The German Salt Museum in the German town of Lüneburg, on the site of the old production facilities of the Lüneburg Saltworks (Lüneburger Saline) when it was closed in 1980.  In 1991, it won the Council of Europe Museum Prize.

This industrial memorial which is based in the boiling house built in 1924 is one of the earliest of its type. It recalls the history of the oldest and, at one time, the greatest industrial operation in central Europe.

The museum is divided into four exhibition areas: 
 Salt in general (Salz allgemein)
 20th century (20. Jahrhundert)
 19th century (19. Jahrhundert)
 Middle Ages and Early modern period (Mittelalter and frühe Neuzeit)

During the summer demonstrations take place in a replica of part of a medieval boiling hut are available on request. Members of the salt museum staff, dressed in historical costume, demonstrate the salt-boiling process using lead salt pans heated on wood fires.

See also 
 Old Salt Road
 Stecknitz Canal
 Sülze Saltworks
 List of food and beverage museums

External links 

 German Salt Museum (German)

Lüneburg (district)
Food museums in Germany
Museums in Lower Saxony
Salt museums